Queens—Shelburne was a federal electoral district in the province of Nova Scotia, Canada, that was represented in the House of Commons of Canada from 1949 to 1953.

This riding was created in 1947 from Queens—Lunenburg and Shelburne—Yarmouth—Clare ridings. It consisted of the counties of Queens and Shelburne. It was abolished in 1952 when it was redistributed back into those districts.

Its only Member of Parliament was Donald Smith of the Liberal Party of Canada.

Members of Parliament

This riding elected the following Members of Parliament:

Election results

See also 

 List of Canadian federal electoral districts
 Past Canadian electoral districts

External links 
 Riding history for Queens—Shelburne (1947–1952) from the Library of Parliament

Former federal electoral districts of Nova Scotia